Christopher Manno (born November 4, 1988) is an American former professional baseball pitcher. He played for the Spain National Team in the 2013 World Baseball Classic.

Career
A native of Brooklyn, New York, Manno attended Xaverian High School and Duke University. While at Duke, Manno played collegiate summer baseball for the Harwich Mariners of the Cape Cod Baseball League, was named a league all-star, and helped lead the team to the league title. He was selected by the Washington Nationals in the 26th round of the 2010 MLB Draft.

On July 27, 2011, Manno, along with Bill Rhinehart, was traded from the Washington Nationals to the Cincinnati Reds for Jonny Gomes.

The week of May 23–29, 2014, Manno was released by the Cincinnati Reds. The week of May 30–June 4, 2014, Manno was signed by the Washington Nationals. The week of July 25–31, 2014 Manno was released by the Washington Nationals.

References

External links

Duke Blue Devils bio

1988 births
Living people
Duke Blue Devils baseball players
Harwich Mariners players
Gulf Coast Nationals players
Hagerstown Suns players
Bakersfield Blaze players
Pensacola Blue Wahoos players
2013 World Baseball Classic players
Sportspeople from Brooklyn
Baseball players from New York City